Brucella intermedia is a bacterium from the genus of Brucella.  It was first described by Velasco and others in 1998. It causes diseases in humans only rarely, with single case reports of cholangitis following liver transplantation, bacteremia in a patient with bladder cancer, a pelvic abscess after abdominal surgery, dyspepsia, endophthalmitis in the presence of a foreign body, pneumonia, and endocarditis.

B. intermedia, B. anthropi, and Brucella melitensis can be distinguished on the basis of a multi-primer polymerase chain reaction that targets the recA gene. A genome of B. intermedia was sequenced and submitted to GenBank in 2013.

References

External links
Type strain of Ochrobactrum intermedium at BacDive -  the Bacterial Diversity Metadatabase

Hyphomicrobiales
Bacteria described in 1998